Dragon Centre is a nine-storey shopping centre in the Sham Shui Po area of Kowloon, Hong Kong. It was the largest in West Kowloon until the Elements opened above the Kowloon MTR station.

History 
Located beside the historic Sham Shui Po Police Station, the centre was built on part of the site of the former Sham Shui Po Camp, a prisoner-of-war camp for Commonwealth forces captured during the Japanese occupation of Hong Kong, which was also used to house Vietnamese refugees in the late 1970s and 1980s.

Features 
The leading tenant is Sincere, a department store. Sunlight shines from the skylight through to the first floor. A bus terminus is located on the ground floor.

The ninth floor features Sky Fantasia, a children's entertainment centre, and an indoor roller coaster, the Sky Train. This hangs from the roof and was the second indoor roller coaster in Hong Kong (the first was located in the Wonderful World of Whimsy in Cityplaza), but it has been closed since the mid-2000s. The eighth floor features an ice skating rink, the Sky Rink, and a food court.

The Dragon Centre won the Hong Kong Institute of Architects 1994 Certificate of Merit Award.

Anchors and retailers

 Sixty Eight Store 
 Apple Mall, a mall-within-a-mall, split into 3 levels on the 5th, 7th, and 9th floors
 Baleno
 Bossini
 BSX
 City Chain
 Fortress World
 Pizza Hut
 McDonald's
 KFC
 Yoshinoya
 Ajisen Ramen
 Pokka Cafe
 Kee Wah Bakery
 Aji Ichiban Co., Ltd
 Bank of China
 HSBC ATM
 7-Eleven
 Watsons
 Sincere
 Mannings
 ParknShop Superstore
 Lenscrafters
 Jumpin Gym USA
 Fairwood
 Cafe 360
 Kumon

Transport
The Dragon Centre is served by the Sham Shui Po station of the MTR.

References

Further reading

External links

Dragon Centre website
Pictures of the roller coaster

1994 establishments in Hong Kong
Sham Shui Po
Shopping malls established in 1994
Shopping centres in Hong Kong